Caloptilia flava is a moth of the family Gracillariidae. It is known from southern Russia and Rhodes.

The larvae feed on Glycyrrhiza echinata. They mine the leaves of their host plant. The mine has the form of a narrow, shallow corridor that may be so strongly contorted as to suggest a secondary blotch. This is continued into a lower-surface tentiform mine with a longitudinal fold, that causes the leaflet to curl over. Older larvae leave the mine and spin two leaflets together by connecting the upper surfaces. They then eat out these leaflets from the inside.

References 

flava
Moths described in 1871
Moths of Europe